Shur Bolagh (also Romanized as Shūr Bolāgh) is a village in Khoshkrud Rural District, in the Central District of Zarandieh County, Markazi Province, Iran. At the 2006 census, its population was 26, in 5 families.

References 

Populated places in Zarandieh County